Type 4 or Type Four may refer to:

Military
Type 4 Chi-To, a Japanese tank
Type 4 Ke-Nu, a Japanese tank
Type 4 Ka-Tsu, a Japanese amphibious tank
Type 4 Ho-Ro, a Japanese self-propelled gun
Type 4 Ha-To, a Japanese self-propelled gun
Type 4 75 mm AA gun, a Japanese anti-aircraft gun
Type 4 20 cm rocket launcher, a Japanese mortar rocket
Type 4 15 cm howitzer, a Japanese howitzer
Type 4 rifle, a Japanese experimental rifle

Transportation
British Railways Type 4 Diesel locomotives
Type Four platform, a front-wheel-drive car platform
Volkswagen Type 4, a four-door sedan
Peugeot Type 4

Other uses
Type 4 encryption, an encryption algorithm
Type IV collagen, a class of collagen
Type-4 hypersensitivity, a class of Hypersensitivity reactions that involves T-cells
 IEC Type IV, one of the four "type" classifications of audio cassette formulation

See also
4 (disambiguation)
Category 4 (disambiguation)